Berend Westdijk (born 5 March 1985) is a Netherlands cricketer. He was born at The Hague.

Westdijk was part of the Netherlands squad at the World Cup.

References

1985 births
Living people
Netherlands One Day International cricketers
Dutch cricketers
Cricketers at the 2011 Cricket World Cup
Sportspeople from The Hague